Sundale Apartments is a 55-storey tower in Southport, Australia, occupied by Meriton Suites and privately owned apartments. The building is one of the tallest on the Gold Coast and is the tallest in the Southport area. It is located in the Meriton Retail Precinct Sundale Southport and trades as Meriton Suites Southport. 

It was built by the billionaire developer Harry Triguboff for $400 million, with the first units going to market in 2014.

References

Skyscrapers on the Gold Coast, Queensland
Southport, Queensland
Buildings and structures under construction in Australia